The Women's time trial at the 2006 UCI Road World Championships took place over a distance of  in Salzburg, Austria on 20 September 2006.

Final classification

Source

References

Women's Time Trial
UCI Road World Championships – Women's time trial
Road World Championships - Women's Time Trial
2006 in women's road cycling